The Building at 561 West 200 South in Salt Lake City, Utah, is a 2-story brick commercial building constructed about 1910 in the city's ethnic Greek neighborhood. Four second floor windows are separated by brick pilasters below a wide, denticulated cornice. The windows form an arcade with a recessed, segmented horizontal course of brick at the springer level and with arches bisected by prominent, narrow keystones. The Building at 561 West 200 South was added to the National Register of Historic Places in 1982.

The Building at 561 West 200 South was constructed for real estate speculator John J. Corum, and it contained a boarding house and saloon, both operated by Peter Fotis. In 1914 Anast Koulis ran a coffeehouse and saloon at the site, and Frank Manos owned the boardinghouse. Peter Zaharias operated a barbershop in the building at the time. In the late 1920s the building functioned as a warehouse; it then became home to Alder Sales Corporation, and then home to Fishler Furniture and Hardware Company.

See also
 Building at Rear, 537 West 200 South

References

External links

		
National Register of Historic Places in Salt Lake City
Commercial buildings completed in 1910
Commercial buildings on the National Register of Historic Places in Utah